Heinz Versteeg (24 March 1939 – 15 October 2009) was a Dutch professional footballer active primarily in Germany. Versteeg played as a striker for Meidericher SV and Hamborn 07.

External links

1939 births
2009 deaths
Bundesliga players
Deaths from cancer in Germany
Dutch expatriate sportspeople in Germany
Dutch footballers
Expatriate footballers in Germany
MSV Duisburg players
Association football forwards